Mahnomen is an unincorporated community and census-designated place (CDP) in Brevator Township, Saint Louis County, Minnesota, United States. Its population was 239 as of the 2010 census.

Mahnomen is located in the southern portion of Brevator Township near Cloquet.  The community is located between Brookston and Cloquet.  The Saint Louis River flows through the community.

The center of Mahnomen is generally considered at the intersection of Mahnomen Road and Brookston Road.

Demographics

References

Census-designated places in St. Louis County, Minnesota
Census-designated places in Minnesota